Cheshmeh Mahi or Chashmeh Mahi may refer to:
 Cheshmeh Mahi, Hamadan
 Cheshmeh Mahi, Ilam
 Cheshmeh Mahi, Razavi Khorasan